The 2023 Football South Australia Federation Cup, sometimes referred to as the 2023 Australia Cup Preliminary Rounds South Australia, is the 110th running of the Federation Cup, the main association football knockout cup competition in South Australia. The competition runs alongside the 2023 Australia Cup preliminary rounds, with the two finalists qualifying for the main knockout competition.

Adelaide City are the defending champions, winning their 18th title after a record-breaking 5–0 victory over Modbury Jets in 2022. Both teams made it to the Australia Cup Round of 16.

Round and dates
Preliminary round nominations for teams in the South Australian Amateur Soccer League and South Australian Regional Leagues to apply to enter the knockout competition on 16 December 2022 and closed on 18 January 2023.

Teams
A total of 46 teams are participating in the 2023 Federation Cup competition. National Premier Leagues South Australia, State League One and State League Two represent levels 2–4 on the Australian league system, and are required to participate in the Federation Cup. The South Australian Regional Leagues represent level 5. The South Australian Amateur Soccer League is not represented on the national league system. Adelaide United Youth are not eligibile for the tournament, as the senior team has the chance to enter the Australia Cup competition at the Round of 32.

First round
The first round of the Federation Cup was the third round of the 2023 Australia Cup preliminary rounds. 28 teams played between the dates of 10 and 12 February, and 7 teams received a bye to the Round of 32. The draw for the round was held on 20 January at 16:30 ACDT, and the dates and venues were confirmed 31 January. The round included teams from level 3 and below.

All times are in ACDT

Byes: Adelaide Croatia Raiders (3), Elizabeth Downs (–), Elizabeth Grove (–), Noarlunga United (4), Pontian Eagles (4), Salisbury United (4), Tea Tree Gully City (–)

Second round
<onlyinclude>The second round of the Federation Cup was the fourth round of the 2023 Australia Cup preliminary rounds. It saw the 14 first round winners, the seven teams who received a bye and the 11 teams from the National Premier Leagues South Australia play between the dates of 16 and 19 March. No matches were scheduled for 17 March, as Adelaide United played a home game at Coopers Stadium as apart of the 2022–23 A-League Men. The draw for the round was held on 20 February, at 16:00 ACDT,</ref> and the dates and venues were confirmed 28 February. The round had teams from levels 2 and below. Five teams from level 5 or outside of the soccer league system participated in this round, Adelaide University Grads Blue, Elizabeth Downs, Elizabeth Grove, Ghan United and Tea Tree Gully City.

All times are in ACDT

</onlyinclude>

Third round
The third round of the Federation Cup will be the fifth round of the 2023 Australia Cup preliminary rounds. It will see the 16 second round winners playing between the dates of 14 and 16 April. No matches will be scheduled for 16 April, as Adelaide United are playing a home game at Coopers Stadium as apart of the 2022–23 A-League Men. The lowest ranked team in this round is Ghan United, who is outside of the soccer league system

Qualified teams
Adelaide City (2)
Adelaide Comets (2)
Adelaide Olympic (2)
Campbelltown City (2)
Croydon FC (2)
FK Beograd (2)
Modbury Jets (2)
North Eastern MetroStars (2)
Sturt Lions (2)
Adelaide Cobras (3)
Eastern United (3)
Playford City Patriots (3)
West Torrens Birkalla (3)
Adelaide University (4)
Noarlunga United (4)
Ghan United (–)

Quarter-finals
The quarter-finals of the Federation Cup will be the sixth round of the 2023 Australia Cup preliminary rounds. It will see the eight third round winners playing on the dates of 10 May and 17 May.

Semi-finals
The semi-finals of the Federation Cup will be the seventh and final round of the 2023 Australia Cup preliminary rounds, with the two winners qualifying for the 2023 Australia Cup. It will see the four quarter-final winners playing on the dates of 31 May and 7 June at ServiceFM Stadium.

Final
The Federation Cup Final will be held on 16 July 2023 at ServiceFM Stadium.

Top Goalscorers
Italics indicates that the team/player has been eliminated from the tournament.

References

2023 in Australian soccer